Committee Bay (referred to as Nattiligaarjuk by Inuit) is an Arctic waterway in Kitikmeot Region, Nunavut, Canada. It forms the southeast end of the Gulf of Boothia and is bounded on the east by the Melville Peninsula, and to the northwest by the Simpson Peninsula.  Wales Island lies within the bay. It was first explored by John Rae (explorer) in 1846/47.

Bays of Kitikmeot Region